is an autobahn in eastern Germany. 

The route comprises two disconnected sections: 
 The old A 241. A North-South route in Mecklenburg-Vorpommern which runs from Wismar to Schwerin.
 The original A 14. A West-East route which starts at the A 2 near Magdeburg in Saxony-Anhalt and terminates at the A 4 at Dresden in Saxony. On the way, it serves Halle and Leipzig.
Construction is underway to connect the two sections.

Under construction 
 Lüderitz - Tangerhütte (Opening in 2023).

Exit list

 

 

 
 

    (planned)
 

 (later Schwerin-Mitte) 
 

 
 
 

 

|-
|colspan="3"|

 

|-
|colspan="3"|

|-
|colspan="3"|

|-
|colspan="3"|

 

 

 

 

 

  

  

 

  
 

 

 

 

 
 

  

   
 
 
 
   
 

|}

External links 

14
A014
A014
A014
A014